The Organization of Asia-Pacific News Agencies (OANA) is an association of news agencies from UNESCO (United Nations Educational, Scientific and Cultural Organization) member states in the Asia-Pacific region. It was previously known as the Organization of Asian News Agencies.

It was formed in 1961 on UNESCO's initiative. It provides a news wire service containing articles donated by its members.

Members
The following agencies are members of OANA.

See also

Asia-Pacific
Journalism

References

External links

News agencies based in Azerbaijan
UNESCO
Organizations established in 1961